Now That's What I Call Music! 22 is the 22nd edition of the (U.S.) Now! series. It was released on July 11, 2006. It debuted at number one on the Billboard 200 and is the ninth number-one album in the series. The album has been certified Platinum.

Now! 22 features five Billboard Hot 100 number-one hits: "SOS", "Temperature", "Ridin'", "Check on It" and "Bad Day".

Track listing

Charts

Weekly charts

Year-end charts

References

2006 compilation albums
 022
Sony Music compilation albums